The Avro 707 (also known as Type 707) is a British experimental aircraft built to test the tailless thick delta wing configuration chosen for the Avro 698 jet bomber, later named the Vulcan. In particular, the low-speed characteristics of such aircraft were not well known at the time. Aerodynamically, it was a one-third scale version of the Vulcan.

Design and development

The 707 was a "proof-of-concept" delta design that was principally the work of Stuart D. Davies, Avro chief designer. The diminutive experimental aircraft initially incorporated a wing with about 50° sweep, without a horizontal tail on a fin with trailing edge sweep. The trailing edge of the wing carried two pairs of control surfaces: inboard elevators and outboard ailerons. Retractable airbrakes were provided above and below the wings.
The prototypes were ordered by the Ministry of Supply to Specification E.15/48. The aircraft were produced quickly using a few components from other aircraft including the first prototype using a Gloster Meteor canopy.  The 707 programme provided valuable insights into the Vulcan's flight characteristics, most of the information coming from the second and third prototypes which flew before the Vulcan. All 707s were powered by a single Rolls-Royce Derwent centrifugal turbojet. The air intake on the first prototype and later 707B was located on the upper rear fuselage. Five 707s were built altogether.

Operational history

The first, the Avro 707, VX784 first flew from Boscombe Down on 4 September 1949 with Squadron Leader Samuel Eric Esler, DFC, AE, at the controls. The prototype crashed less than a month later, on 30 September, near Blackbushe, killing Esler. The next prototype, VX790, renamed the 707B, had a longer nose, different cockpit canopy, a wing of different (51°) sweep and a longer nose wheel leg to provide the high angle of incidence required by deltas for landing and take off. The 707B was given the same dorsal engine intake as the 707, although this was later modified to a NACA design. It first flew on 6 September 1950. Both these aircraft were built to test low speed characteristics.

The third aircraft, designated 707A, WD280 was built for higher speed testing. Experience with the dorsal intake of the earlier 707 and 707B had shown that as speed increased, the cockpit induced turbulence which interrupted the intake airflow, so the intakes were moved to the wing roots. When the Vulcan appeared, it looked very much like an enlarged 707A. Later, this 707A was used to test the compound leading edge sweep subsequently used on all Vulcans. Although the first Vulcan prototype was already flying, a second 707A WZ736 was built to speed the development programme, making its maiden fight on 20 February 1953.

The final variant was the two-seat 707C; originally four examples were ordered by the RAF for use in orientation training revolving around flying aircraft with delta wing configurations. The 707C had "side-by-side" seating with dual-controls but the production order was cancelled with only the sole prototype, WZ744 built. The 707C had its maiden flight on 1 July 1953 and was ultimately employed in other research that did not involve Vulcan development.

Even after the Vulcan development phase was over, the four surviving 707s, in individual bright blue, red, orange and silver (natural metal) colour schemes, continued in use as research aircraft. After the compound sweep investigation and a period with the Royal Aircraft Establishment (R.A.E) carrying out handling trials with powered controls, the first 707A went to the Aeronautical Research Laboratories in Australia for low-speed delta wing airflow measurements. The second 707A was also at the R.A.E from June 1953 for aerodynamic and later, automatic control investigations.

The Avro 707B joined the R.A.E. in September 1952 and was one of the aircraft used by the Empire Test Pilots School from January to September 1956, when it was damaged on landing, and broken up at R.A.E. Bedford. The two-seat 707C joined the R.A.E. January 1956; perhaps its most substantial research contribution was to the development of fly-by-wire control systems, one of the first of their kind, and fitted with a side stick controller. This aircraft was flying with the R.A.E. until September 1966 when it achieved its full airframe time.

The Avro 707s made public appearances at the Farnborough Airshows in both September 1952 and 1953. In 1952, the first prototype Vulcan flew with the 707s A and B and in 1953, the four surviving 707s flew alongside the first two Avro 698 Vulcan prototypes.

Surviving aircraft

No 707s are now airworthy. Both examples of the Avro 707A variant survive. One, WZ736, was preserved in Great Britain at the Museum of Science and Industry in Manchester, but has been transferred to the Boscombe Down Aviation Collection at Old Sarum, while the other, WD280, is preserved in Australia at the RAAF Museum at Point Cook, Victoria. Also in Great Britain is WZ744, the single 707C, which was displayed at the RAF Museum, Cosford near Wolverhampton and is currently stored out of public view with its space in the museum's Test Flight hall taken by the British Aerospace EAP.

Operators

 Royal Australian Air Force
 Aeronautical Research Laboratories

 Aeroplane and Armament Experimental Establishment
 Royal Aircraft Establishment

Specifications (707C)

See also

Notes

Citations

Bibliography
 Buttler, Tony. "Avro Type 698 Vulcan (Database)." Aeroplane, Vol. 35, No. 4, Issue No. 408, April 2007.
Buttler, Tony and Jean-Louis Delezenne. X-Planes of Europe: Secret Research Aircraft from the Golden Age 1946-1974. Manchester, UK: Hikoki Publications, 2012. 
 Cooper, Peter J. Farnborough: 100 years of British Aviation. Hinkley, UK: Midland Books, 2006. .
 Harlin, E.A. and G.A. Jenks. Avro: An Aircraft Album. Shepperton, Middlesex, UK: Ian Allan, 1973. .
 Jackson, A.J. Avro Aircraft since 1908.  London: Putnam & Co., 1965.
 Jackson, Robert. Combat Aircraft Prototypes since 1945. New York: Arco/Prentice Hall Press, 1986. .
 Winchester, Jim. "Avro 707 (1949)". X-Planes and Prototypes. London: Amber Books Ltd., 2005. .

External links

 Aeroflight

707
1940s British experimental aircraft
Tailless delta-wing aircraft
Single-engined jet aircraft
Aircraft first flown in 1949